"1000 Nights" is a song by English singer-songwriter Ed Sheeran featuring American rappers Meek Mill and A Boogie wit da Hoodie from the former's fourth studio album, No.6 Collaborations Project (2019), released through Asylum Records and Atlantic Records on 12 July 2019. The song was written by the artists alongside producers Boi-1da, Jahaan Sweet, and Fred Again.

Background
Sheeran announced the collaboration, as well as the entire album's tracklist, on 18 June 2019 via Instagram. Immediately following Sheeran's announcement, Londra shared the "crazy surprise" with his fans on social media, saying: "All I can say at this moment is that dreams do come true and thank you, Ed Sheeran, for giving me the opportunity to do what I do on his album."

"1000 Nights" was written as lamentation of Ed Sheeran on his gruelling life on the road while he embarks in different cities each day.

Lyric video
A lyric video for the song was uploaded on Sheeran's YouTube account on 12 July 2019.

Chart performance
"1000 Nights" charted at number 65 and 8 in Canada and Swedish Heatseeker Chart, respectively.

Charts

References

Ed Sheeran songs
Meek Mill songs
A Boogie wit da Hoodie songs
Songs written by Ed Sheeran
Songs written by Boi-1da
2019 songs
Song recordings produced by Boi-1da
Songs written by Meek Mill
Songs written by A Boogie wit da Hoodie
Songs written by Fred Again